John Douglas (born 27 March 1971) is a Guyanese former professional boxer who competed from 1997 to 2010. As an amateur, he competed in the men's light heavyweight event at the 1996 Summer Olympics. Douglas lost his first professional fight in a KO against Wayne Braithwaite (Braithwaite's professional debut) at the Cliff Anderson Sports Hall.

References

External links
 
 

1971 births
Living people
Light-heavyweight boxers
Guyanese male boxers
Olympic boxers of Guyana
Boxers at the 1996 Summer Olympics
Sportspeople from Georgetown, Guyana
20th-century Guyanese people